Jeanne Marie Maloney is an American diplomat and the United States Ambassador to Eswatini.

Early life and education 

Maloney earned a Bachelor of Arts from the College of William and Mary and an Master of Business Administration from the University of Tulsa.

Career 

Maloney is a career member of the Senior Foreign Service, class of Minister-Counselor. She has served in various leadership positions at the State Department over the course of her career, including as Career Development Officer in the Bureau of Human Resources, Director of the Office of Terrorist Screening and Interdiction in the Bureau of Counterterrorism and Countering Violent Extremism, and Deputy Political-Military Counselor at the United States Embassy in Baghdad.  Maloney was also the Director of the Office of Fraud Prevention Programs in the Bureau of Consular Affairs. Previously, she was the Director of the Office of Security Affairs in the State Department's Bureau of African Affairs. She previously served as the Foreign Policy Advisor to United States Army Africa in Vicenza, Italy.

Ambassador to Eswatini 

On May 1, 2020, President Trump announced his intent to nominate Maloney to be the next United States Ambassador to Eswatini. On May 19, 2020, her nomination was sent to the Senate. On November 18, 2020, her nomination was confirmed in the United States Senate by voice vote. She took the oath of office on December 9, 2020. She presented her credentials to King Mswati III on March 4, 2021.

Personal life 
Maloney speaks Portuguese, Spanish, and basic Arabic.

See also
Ambassadors of the United States

References

Year of birth missing (living people)
Place of birth missing (living people)
Living people
21st-century American diplomats
Ambassadors of the United States to Eswatini
American women ambassadors
College of William & Mary alumni
United States Department of State officials
United States Foreign Service personnel
University of Tulsa alumni
21st-century American women
American women diplomats